The Allan D. Emil Memorial Award is presented every year at the Congress of the International Astronautical Federation.

It has been presented annually, since 1977, for an outstanding contribution in space science, space technology, space medicine, or space law which involved the participation of more than one nation and/or which furthered the possibility of greater international cooperation in astronautics.

The award consists of a certificate citation and a stipend donated by the Emil family.

Recipients 

 1977: Charles Stark Draper
 1978: Konstantin Bushuyev, Glynn Lunney
 1979: 
 1980: Thomas P. Stafford
 1981: Peter Jankowitsch, Leonid I. Sedov
 1982: Roger Chevalier
 1983: Roy Gibson
 1984: Luboš Perek
 1985: Hans E.W. Hoffmann
 1986: Robert Freitag
 1987: Ruedeger Reinhard, Burton Edelson, Roald Sagdeev, 
 1988: 
 1989: Johannes Geiss
 1990: Oleg Gazenko, Karl Klein
 1991: Guy Severin, 
 1992: George Müller, U. Ram Rao
 1993: Hubert Curien
 1994: 
 1995: Karl H. Doetsch
 1996: Anatoly Grigoriev
 1997: James Harford
 1998: Alvaro Azcarraga
 1999: Edward C. Stone
 2000: Marcio Barbosa
 2001: Richard Kline
 2002: Jean-Claude Husson
 2003: Liu Jiyuan
 2004: Krishnaswamy Kasturirangan
 2005: 
 2006: 
 2007: Gerhard Haerendel
 2008: Conrad Lautenbacher
 2009: Wei Sun
 2010: 
 2011: Kuniaki Shiraki
 2012: 
 2013: Ma Xingrui
 2014: K. Radhakrishnan
 2015: Virendra Jha
 2016: Charles Elachi
 2017: Lei Fanpei
 2018: Xia Guohong
 2019: Joan Vernikos
 2020: Kailasavadivoo Sivan

See also

 List of space technology awards

External links
 Allan D. Emil Memorial Award | IAF

Awards established in 1977
Space-related awards